The 2011 Champion Hurdle was a horse race held at Cheltenham Racecourse on Tuesday 15 March 2011. It was the 81st running of the Champion Hurdle.

The winner was George Creighton & Rose Boyd's Hurricane Fly, a seven-year-old gelding trained in Ireland by Willie Mullins and ridden by Ruby Walsh. The victory was the first in the race for owner, trainer and rider.

Hurricane Fly won by one and a quarter lengths from Peddlers Cross. There were no previous Champion Hurdlers in the field. All eleven of the runners completed the course.

Race details
 Sponsor: Stan James
 Purse: £370,000; First prize: £210,937
 Going: Good
 Distance: 2 miles 110 yards
 Number of runners: 11
 Winner's time: 3m 53.71

Full result

 Abbreviations: nse = nose; nk = neck; hd = head; dist = distance; UR = unseated rider; PU = pulled up

Winner's details
Further details of the winner, Hurricane Fly.
 Sex: Gelding
 Foaled: 5 April 2004
 Country: Ireland
 Sire: Montjeu; Dam: Scandisk (Kenmare)
 Owner: George Creighton & Rose Boyd
 Breeder: Agricola Del Parco

References

Champion Hurdle
 2011
Champion Hurdle
Champion Hurdle
2010s in Gloucestershire